Anisomeles is a genus of herbs of the family Lamiaceae and is native to China, the Indian Subcontinent, Southeast Asia, New Guinea, Australia, Madagascar, and some Pacific and Indian Ocean islands. Plants in the genus Anisomeles have small, flat, narrow elliptic to narrow e.g.-shaped leaves arranged in opposite pairs, the edges of the leaves sometimes wavy or serrated. The flowers are arranged in groups, with five sepals and five petals in two "lips", the lower lip with three lobes, the middle lobe much longer than the side lobes. There are four stamens that extend beyond the petals and a single style in a depression on top of the ovary. The fruit is a schizocarp with four nutlets containing small seeds.

Taxonomy
The genus Anisomeles was first formally described in 1810 by Robert Brown in his Prodromus Florae Novae Hollandiae et Insulae Van Diemen. The name Anisomeles means "unequal limbs", referring to the petal lobes.

Species list
The following is a list of species of Anisomeles accepted by Plants of the World Online as of March 2021:
 Anisomeles ajugacea (F.M.Bailey & F.Muell.) A.R.Bean - Queensland
 Anisomeles antrorsa A.R.Bean - Queensland
 Anisomeles bundelensis A.R.Bean - Northern Territory
 Anisomeles candicans Benth. - Myanmar, Thailand
 Anisomeles carpentarica A.R.Bean - Northern Territory, Queensland
 Anisomeles eriodes A.R.Bean - Queensland
 Anisomeles farinacea A.R.Bean - Northern Territory, Western Australia
 Anisomeles grandibracteata A.R.Bean - Northern Territory
 Anisomeles indica (L.) Kuntze - China, Tibet, Himalayas, India, Bangladesh, Nepal, Sri Lanka, Maldive Islands, Lakshadweep, Andaman & Nicobar Islands, Indochina, Malaysia, Indonesia, Philippines, New Guinea, Christmas Island, Bismarck Archipelago, Mauritius, Madagascar; naturalized in Fiji, Samoa, Jamaica, Trinidad
 Anisomeles inodora R.Br. - Northern Territory, Queensland, Western Australia
 Anisomeles languida A.R.Bean - Queensland
 Anisomeles leucotricha A.R.Bean - Northern Territory
 Anisomeles macdonaldii A.R.Bean - Queensland
 Anisomeles malabarica (L.) R.Br. ex Sims - India, Bangladesh, Sri Lanka, Andaman & Nicobar Islands, Thailand, Malaysia, Indonesia, New Guinea, Bismarck Archipelago, Mauritius, Réunion, northern Australia
 Anisomeles ornans A.R.Bean - Queensland
 Anisomeles papuana A.R.Bean - Bismarck Archipelago, Maluku, New Guinea, Queensland
 Anisomeles principis A.R.Bean - Lesser Sunda Is., Western Australia
 Anisomeles tirunelveliensis Rajakumar, Selvak. & S.Murug. - India
 Anisomeles viscidula A.R.Bean - Northern Territory, Western Australia
 Anisomeles vulpina A.R.Bean - Queensland
 Anisomeles × intermedia Wight ex Benth. - India

References

 
Lamiaceae genera